This is a list of films produced or shot on location in Malta.

While Malta has produced only a few films, the island has been a common location for filming ancient historical epic films such as Gladiator and Troy.

Maltese films

A
Against All Odds: The Quest for Malta (2004) (TV)
Angli: The Movie (2005)
Adormidera (2013)
Aurora (2017) - 2nd Prize Winner, 2018 China International Contest of Popular Science Works

B
Blin (2004)
Boomering

C
The Call (2012)
Carmen (2021)

D
Daqqet ix-Xita (2010)
Divine Beauty (2018) - Honorable Mention for Best Documentary Short, 2018 Independent Shorts Awards.

E
Earth's Beauty (2018) - Best Music, 2018 Top Indie Film Awards.

G
Gaġġa (1971)
Genesis (2001)
A Gentleman from Malta (1997) (TV)
Ghanja lill-Omm 2006 (2006) (TV)
A Gozitan Tale (1997) (TV)

I
Il-Messija (2009)  (Cinema) by Flash Productions
The Isle (2004)
Iz-Zonqri (1986) - the first Maltese movie released for the local video rentals
Il-Misteru ta' L-Għoġol tad-deheb (2017)

K
Katarin (1977)
Klassi Ghalina & The History of the World (2018)
Kont Diġa (2009)

L
Limestone Cowboy (2016)
 Love to Paradise (2017)
 Lux et Tenebrae (2018) - Best Documentary Short, 2018 Top Indie Film Awards

M
Mera tal-Passat (2004)
Malta George Cross (2005) (video)
Maltageddon (2009) - Maltese blockbuster cinema box office record
Maltaforce cinema (2010)
Medic (2011) - short film; New York Award 
Materre (2017) - 1st Prize Winner, 2018 China International Contest of Popular Science Works
Made in Malta (2019)
Mikha'El (2021) - feature documentary

O
On n'a qu'une vie (2000)
One Fine Day (1997)

P
Pawlu ta' Tarsu (2008)
Phobia (2015)
Pillars of Creation (2018) - Best Multimedia Film Award, Great Message International Film Festival
A Pinch of Salt (2003)
A Previous Engagement (2005)
Profile of a Director (1998)

Q
Qerq (2007) - cinema blockbuster box office record

R
Red Glory (2018) - Two Bronze Awards, 2018 Independent Shorts Awards. Best Music, 2018 Top Indie Film Awards

S
Star wars 7 (2015)
Simshar (2014)
Santa Monika (film) (2009)

T
TeleKabul I (2004)
TeleKabul II (2006)
Tal-Qadi Stone (2007)

V
Voyage (1992)

Films shot in Malta
Agora (2009)
The Battle of the River Plate (1956)
Biotch (by Z.F)
Black Eagle (1988)
By the Sea (2015)
Casino Royale (1967)
Children of Rage (1975)
Christopher Columbus: The Discovery (1992)
Clash of the Titans (1981)
The Count of Monte Cristo (2002)
Cutthroat Island (1995)
The Da Vinci Code (2006)
David Copperfield (1969)
A Different Loyalty (2004)
Divine Beauty (2018)
The Emperor's New Clothes (2001)
The Fifth Missile (1986)
Final Justice (1985)
Gladiator (2000)
Inseminoid (1981)
Jesus (1999)
The League of Extraordinary Gentlemen (2003)
Leviathan (1989)
The Mackintosh Man (1973)
Malta Story (1953)
Midnight Express (1978)
Mikha'El (2021)
Munich (2005)
Murphy's War (1971)
Never Say Never Again (1983)
Open Water 2: Adrift (2006)
Orca (1977)
Pinocchio (2002)
Pirates (1986)
Popeye (1980)
Pulp (1972)
Raise the Titanic! (1976)
Revelation (2001)
Shout at the Devil (film) (1976)
The Sign of the Four (1987)
Sinbad and the Eye of the Tiger (1977)
The Spy Who Loved Me (1977)
Swept Away (2002)
Treasure in Malta (1963)
Trenchcoat (1983)
Troy (2004)
  A Twist of Sand (1967)
U-571 (2000)
The Voyage (1992)
Warlords of Atlantis (1978)
White Squall (1996)
World War Z (2013)

External links
Maltese film at the Internet Movie Database